Rice production or Paddy production is one of the main productions and staple foods in Sri Lanka. Rice is the staple food of 21.8 million Sri Lankans and is the livelihood of more than 1.8 million farmers. More than 30 percent of the total labour force is directly or indirectly involved in the rice sector. In 1998 total production was 2.69 million MT of rough rice (paddy), which is about 96 percent of the national requirement. With the present population growth rate of 1.2 percent, slightly increasing per capita consumption, requirements for seed, and for wastage in handling, Sri Lanka needs about 3.1 million MT of paddy by the year 2005. Hence, it is projected that the national average yield should increase to 4.1 t/ha to feed the population of Sri Lanka in 2005. It cultivates in all districts of Sri Lanka during two monsoon seasons. The seasons are called Maha season and Yala season. (Literally, Sinhala word Maha means bigger and Yala means lesser.) Maha Season starts by September and ends by March during North-east monsoon, and Yala season starts by May and ends by August.

History 
The beginning of paddy cultivation in Sri Lanka, traces its root back to the proud history between 161 B.C. and 1017 A.D. ideal climatic conditions yielded a flourishing crop, which encouraged many Sri Lankans to make paddy cultivation their way of life. Thus it became a focal point of Sri Lankan lives, knitting a beautiful pattern including the society, culture and religious beliefs in the country. The governing Royal minds of Sri Lanka saw the enriching importance of rice cultivation that provoked them to build tanks of extraordinary size and numbers to irrigate the mass scale rice production. At present much of the human and animal labour is replaced with technology, adding greater deal of efficiency towards the production process.

Chemical/inorganic fertilisers were introduced to Sri Lanka in 1950 before which only organic sources were used. The main objective of the fertiliser subsidy programme is to encourage farmers to adopt high-yielding varieties with a view to attaining self-sufficiency in rice and also to ease the burden on the farmers’ budget. On the other hand, the subsidy scheme was initiated to make fertiliser more affordable to encourage its wider use for increasing agriculture productivity. Currently, most of the country’s required inorganic fertiliser is imported. The fertiliser subsidy in Sri Lanka was set in motion in 1962 at the onset of the Green Revolution which afterwards occupied a significant slot in government expenditure in the country. Three main types of fertilizers came to be used – urea to provide nitrogen (N), triple superphosphate (TSP) to provide phosphorus (P) and murate/muriate of potash (MOP) to provide potassium (K). Seven major phases in the provision of the subsidy since its inception in 1962 can be identified and are presented in detail below. The programme envisaged that an increased paddy production would lower the prices of paddy and rice, thereby making rice affordable to the consumer, other than reducing the cost of production. At the inception, a fixed fertiliser subsidy was introduced and different fertiliser types were subsidised at different rates. The subsidy was provided for all three main types of fertilisers: urea, TSP and MOP primarily targeted paddy. Until 1975, the subsidy level varied according to the type of crop. Since, this scheme was found to be unsuccessful as it allowed unauthorised leakages of fertiliser between agricultural sub sectors, in 1975, the government introduced a uniform subsidy scheme for all crop sectors. However, subsidy rates varied according to the type of fertiliser, with the rates subjected to revision over time, necessitated by the highly volatile prices of fertiliser in the world market.

In 2019, president Gotabaya Rajapaksa campaigned to eliminate artificial pesticides. In April 2021 he "declared that the entire country would immediately switch to organic farming", yet as of February 2022, still "a majority of farmers say they received no training in organic techniques". The 2021 rice harvest failed, leading to a $1.2 billion emergency food aid program, a $200 million income-support program, and "huge sums to import hundreds of thousands of tonnes of rice". Rajapaska's "sudden and disastrous turn toward organic farming" was panned in international media and the policies were scaled back before the year was over.

Chronic kidney disease 
Chronic kidney disease of undetermined causes (CKDu), initially reported among agricultural communities in  Sri Lanka, particularly in Southern rural areas, and could be common in other tropical and subtropical rural settings.

Production statistics

References 

Agriculture in Sri Lanka
Sri Lanka